Coronation Street is a British soap opera, initially produced by Granada Television. Created by writer Tony Warren, Coronation Street first broadcast on ITV on 9 December 1960. The following is a list of characters introduced in the show's fifth year, by order of first appearance.

In what remains one of the serial's most dramatic and influential years to date, 1964 saw no less than four producers take the helm of the show. Apart from a short month-long break in which original producer Stuart Latham took over for one last stint, Margaret Morris presided over Coronation Street until May, in which she introduced Irma Ogden (Sandra Gough) in late January. Radical young producer Tim Aspinall took the reins in May and quickly made his mark by writing out several characters including Frank Barlow, Harry and Concepta Hewitt, Jerry and Myra Booth and most controversially, Martha Longhurst, a favourite with viewers who Aspinall chose to kill off in his first episode. A week later, Aspinall introduced a new regular in the form of Charlie Moffitt (Gordon Rollings).

In June, Aspinall chose to give newcomer Irma Ogden a family, and cast Bernard Youens and Jean Alexander in the roles of her parents Stan and Hilda. The couple  remained with the series for the next twenty years. Today, Hilda Ogden is considered an iconic character in Coronation Street's history. After a short, turbulent stint, Aspinall departed the show in September and H.V. Kershaw returned to the role. Kershaw introduced Sandra Petty (Heather Moore) in October, originally in a guest role. Barbara Mullaney also made her first appearance as Rita Littlewood for a single episode in December, eight years before returning as a regular cast member.

Irma Barlow

Irma Barlow (née Freda Ogden) was played by Sandra Gough between 1964 and 1971. Having previously changed her name from Freda, Irma came to Weatherfield with the sole purpose to escape her family, with whom she did not get on. Just months after her arrival however, the rest of the Ogden family, Irma's mother Hilda, father Stan and brother Trevor, followed her and moved into number thirteen Coronation Street.

Irma struck up a relationship with local footballer David Barlow in 1965 and the pair get married in December that year. Following David's decision to cut short his footballing career after several setbacks, David and Irma went into business together, and bought the Corner Shop when it went up for sale in 1966. Settled in their new life, Irma and David try for a baby in 1967 but after a brief four-month pregnancy, Irma suffered a miscarriage. Broken hearted, she resigned herself to the fact she would never have children. Irma eventually grew tired of being a postmistress, and David eventually relaunched his football career. After David is signed to an Australian team, the Barlows moved to Australia in April 1968. Whilst there, Irma discovered she was pregnant again and gave birth to a son, Darren Barlow, in November 1968.

In 1970 the producers of Coronation Street decided to reintroduce the Barlows, but Alan Rothwell, the actor who played David, turned down the opportunity to return as he had found work elsewhere. Still keen to bring back Irma, the producers decided that instead of splitting the couple, David and two-year-old Darren were to be killed in a car crash off-screen. Upon arriving back on the Street, Irma was rehired at the Corner Shop by the new owner Maggie Cooke and shared the flat above, her former home, with barmaid Bet Lynch. Irma had a brief fling with Ray Langton in 1971, but after the episode broadcast on 8 December (1137) Sandra Gough walked out and in the next episode Irma was said to have left suddenly and Maggie Clegg told Betty Turpin "all she said was she was going to stop with a friend for a bit" Irma never returned to Weatherfield and it was later revealed that she had contacted Maggie Clegg to buy her out of the shop and had moved to Llandudno in North Wales. She was believed to still be living there at the time of her parents' ruby wedding anniversary in 1983. She then emigrated to Canada and did not return for her father Stan's funeral in November 1984, much to the disappointment of her brother Trevor.

In a 2012 episode of "The Corrie Years - After the Street" Sandra Gough was interviewed and finally revealed why she had left so abruptly. She revealed how Alan Rothwell had wanted to leave for some time & had told her that he would not leave because they (The producers) would write her out as well. One day she went to Alan and told him they were going to tell the Producer they were both leaving. When she came back a few years later she said "my mother had a bone disease and was very very ill. I asked them (The Producers) for months and months, please write me out, please write me out...then in the end just to finish filming one Friday...and I never went in on the Monday" She went on to say "I am very sorry and I will say ashamed to do that" she appeared surprised how the story of her disappearance appeared in all the papers because she said "I phoned and told them...I said I'm going because you would not let me go properly, I'm going"

Eddie Thomas

Eddie Thomas was the young apprentice of Len Fairclough at the builder's yard. He dated 16-year-old Lucille Hewitt, but the teen romance did not last. Eddie also briefly dated Joyce Lennox. When a mistake by Len leads to elderly resident Minnie Caldwell falling through the banister on the stairs at the Viaduct, Minnie is persuaded to take action and sue Len. To pay compensation to Minnie, he is forced to make both Eddie and Jerry Booth redundant. Both men left Weatherfield soon after in search of work although Jerry later returned.

Ted Ashley

Ted Ashley returned to his native Weatherfield after fifty years spent living in Australia. Martha Longhurst remembered her first love, and threw herself at him, only for Ted to turn her down. In truth, Ted had always loved Ena Sharples, but Ena was not interested. She stepped aside once again when she heard her friend Martha was hoping to marry him. Two months after Ted left, Martha died after suffering a heart attack.

Gus Lowman

Gus Lowman was introduced as the new manager of the Viaduct Sporting Club. On opening night, the ceiling collapsed and Len was blamed for shoddy workmanship, with Gus refusing to pay Len for his work. As it turned out, the collapse had been Gus' fault as he'd placed too much weight on the ceiling by using the upstairs as a liquor store, and Len was eventually paid.

Rosemary Fraser

Rosemary Fraser was the wife of Laurie Fraser. Laurie had been seeing Elsie Tanner behind Rosemary's back, and he brazenly employed Elsie at the club where his wife was a regular customer. Elsie found out his betrayal and finished the relationship.

Stuart Hodges

Stuart Hodges took over the role of preacher at The Glad Tidings Mission Hall when Leonard Swindley was forced to take a rest after having a minor breakdown. Emily Nugent, a regular at the Mission, fell for Hodges as did most of the women. Even Ena Sharples took a liking to him when he helped her out with her cleaning job. Hodges left the Street to allow Swindley to take his job back, but returned months later with the news that the Mission was to merge with another in Weatherfield.

Lily Haddon

Lily Haddon (née Longhurst) was the daughter of Rovers cleaner Martha Longhurst. Martha mentioned her frequently during her time on the show, and her absence became something of a running joke. Lily and her husband Wilf finally made their first and last appearances at Martha's funeral.

Charlie Moffitt

Charlie Moffitt moved into number 5 with dog Little Titch and his pigeons to lodge with Minnie Caldwell following the departure of Tickler Murphy. Charlie fancied himself as a comedian, and worked as so at the Viaduct Sporting Club. Charlie made enemies of the female residents when he organised a night of exotic dancers at the club, causing a lot of consternation for the men who visited. One of the exotic dancers had been a red-haired young lady called Rita Littlewood, who Dennis Tanner took home, though his hopes were dashed when she took to Elsie's bed instead.

The next year, Charlie quit showbusiness and borrowed £50 from Ena Sharples to invest in insurance. However, when he lost half of the money, he left the area fearing the sack. The lost money was in fact in the hands of Hilda Ogden, who'd found it and had spent it. When she learnt that the money was Charlie's she returned the goods she'd bought and set about on returning the money. About a month later Charlie was eventually tracked down to a working men's club, and was persuaded to return home. He left the Street once again at the end of the year for a season in pantomime and never returned.

Pip Mistral

Pip Mistral was an exotic dancer who meets Charlie Moffitt and asks him to a party. Charlie invited his friends by her request, so Ken Barlow, Harry Hewitt and Len Fairclough join them. To Ken's surprise, he soon finds himself immersed in conversation with Pip and they talk all night. Ken tells Pip she is wasted as a dancer, and that he would like to see her again, but Pip senses what he is alluding to and rejects his advances. Ken's wife Valerie finds out the next day, and is deeply hurt that he connected with someone on such a deep level. She claimed she'd rather he'd have kissed her.

Stan Ogden

Hilda Ogden

Trevor Ogden

Trevor (also Dudley) Ogden was the son of Stan and Hilda Ogden. He arrived with his family in 1964, but when the Street residents took cover in the Mission hall basement during a bomb scare, 15-year-old Trevor took his opportunity to raid the houses and left for London with the stolen goods.

Nine years later, Stan and Hilda tracked Trevor down to Chesterfield where he was living with his wife and son. Trevor was horrified to see them, as he had told his wife Polly that his parents had died in a car crash. The family patched up their differences and the Ogdens went home. Trevor made three visits to Weatherfield, making his last appearance in November 1984 when he attended his father's funeral, expressing his disappointment that his sister Irma (by then living in Canada) had not made the effort to attend. After making sure his mother was OK, Trevor got in his car and drove home.

David Graham

David Graham was an art teacher at a School of Design where Elsie Tanner took an evening job as a life model. David became infatuated with Elsie, but the affair was brief when his intensity proved too much for Elsie. When she attempted to end their relationship, David produced a gun and threatened to kill her. Before he could do anything, however, Elsie's son Dennis arrived and stopped him and Elsie resigned from her job.

Tickler Murphy

"Tickler" Murphy was a man who Minnie Caldwell took in as lodger. Irish Tickler swept shopkeeper Florrie Lindley off her feet, and the pair enjoyed a short romance until Florrie began speaking of marriage and the future. Tickler ended the relationship, and fled the country, leaving Florrie alone once again.

Sandra Petty

Sandra Petty was the daughter of shopkeeper Lionel Petty, who she followed to Weatherfield when he bought the Corner Shop. Soon after her arrival, Emily Nugent gave her a job at Gamma Garments and she met Dennis Tanner. Sandra and Dennis began a relationship which lasted for months until Sandra grew annoyed by the way in which Dennis treated her like a sister rather than a girlfriend. She split up with him, resigned from her job, moved into a new flat and left the Street.

Sgt. Bowden

Sgt Bowden, played by actor James Beck (later known for his role in Dad's Army), was the local police officer in charge of Weatherfield district who appeared intermittently between 1964 and 1967. He is first seen when, after taking his new post, he introduces himself to the local residents and fines Jack Walker for serving drinks in the Rovers Return pub after hours. In all, he made 8 appearances on the programme. His last appearance came when he caught Steve Tanner, Len Fairclough and Albert Tatlock gambling, but rather than take action, he joined in the game.

Alf Chadwick

Alf Chadwick was employed to play piano in the Rovers when the Walkers got a new license. Alf appeared infrequently for the next year and played piano for the Coronation Street pantomimes in both 1964 and 1968, when regular pianist Ena Sharples was otherwise engaged.

William Piggott

William Piggott was the father of a pupil at the Weatherfield high school where Ken Barlow had recently taken a job. In a bribe, William offered Ken £100 to ensure his son passed an exam. Ken considered the opportunity, needing the money, but his morals were too strong and he publicly returned the money to William and called the police. Valerie stated afterwards that it was a shame he did so, the money would have been helpful as she was pregnant with twins.

Rita Sullivan

Others

References

1964
, Coronation Street
Coronation Street